Gassire's Lute is an epic by the Soninke people of West Africa. It was collected by Leo Frobenius and published in 1921.  An English prose translation was made by Douglas Fox, published in African Genesis (first printed 1937).

This lyrical epic narrative tells the story of a prince who gives up his ambition to become king, and instead becomes a diari, the Soninke equivalent to a griot.

Summary
Gassire is a prince of Wagadu and the future successor of his father, but his father, though old, just will not die and make way for his son. Gassire wants to be king very badly, and becomes a mighty warrior to demonstrate his strength. Gassire consults an old wise man who tells him that Gassire will abandon his quest to be king to play the lute.  He also tells him that he will not be king and other people will become king after the death of his father, and the empire will fall. He hears the sound of the lute, and has one made for him because he loves the sound so much. When he tries to play the lute, it does not produce any sound.  He hears that it can only be played if he goes into battle. He then hears that his sons must go to battle for the lute to play; in battle, seven of his sons die, but the lute will still not play. The people exiled him because of his violence and disregard for his family. He went into the desert with his one remaining son, his wives, and a few loyal friends. He finally can play the lute when he sings of the empire and the story provides lessons to all the people who listen.

While the story has enchanted readers since it first appeared, it should be approached with caution.  Frobenius attributes it to the Soninke people of West Africa, the people associated with the Empire of Wagadu or Ghana, and the name Gassire is in fact a Soninke word for a bard/singer (known as griots elsewhere in Western Africa). While many of the stories Frobenius collected can be confirmed by modern research in the oral tradition, this story stands alone and no analogue has yet been reported.

Manuscript and editions
The poem was collected by Leo Frobenius in 1909, who published a prose translation of the poem in his collection Speilmanns-Geschichten der Sahel (vol. 6, 1921). Frobenius regarded the poem as a fragment from a much longer epic tradition, a view maintained also by Alta Jablow, a scholar who presented a paper on the poem in 1978, which was subsequently published in the journal Research in African Literatures. Jablow published an English translation of Frobenius's original in 1971, illustrated by Leo and Diane Dillon, and with a six-page glossary. That edition was republished in 1991 by Waveland Press, with the 1978 essay included.

References

Rosenberg, Donna.  "Gassire's Lute."  World Mythology: An Anthology of the Great Myths And Epics.    3rd ed.  Chicago: NTC, 1999.

African literature
Epic poems in Soninke